The 1999 Palmer Cup was held on June 12–13, 1999 on the Honors Course, Chattanooga, Tennessee. The United States won 17½ to 6½.

Format
On Saturday, there were four matches of four-ball in the morning, followed by four foursomes matches in the afternoon. Eight singles matches were played on the Sunday morning with a further eight more in the afternoon. In all, 24 matches were played.

Each of the 24 matches was worth one point in the larger team competition. If a match was all square after the 18th hole, each side earned half a point toward their team total. The team that accumulated at least 12½ points won the competition.

Teams
Eight college golfers from the United States and Great Britain and Ireland participated in the event.

Saturday's matches

Morning four-ball

Afternoon foursomes

Sunday's matches

Morning singles

Afternoon singles

References

External links
Palmer Cup official site

Arnold Palmer Cup
Golf in Tennessee
Palmer Cup
Palmer Cup
Palmer Cup
Palmer Cup